Harvey Jesse Wood (10 April 1885 – 18 December 1958) was an English field hockey player who won a gold medal with the England team at the 1908 Summer Olympics in London.

References

External links
 

1885 births
1958 deaths
English male field hockey players
English Olympic medallists
Field hockey players at the 1908 Summer Olympics
Olympic field hockey players of Great Britain
Olympic gold medallists for Great Britain
Olympic medalists in field hockey
Medalists at the 1908 Summer Olympics